The 2004 Pennsylvania Democratic presidential primary took place on April 27, 2004. It was open to registered Democrats only.

Eligibility
In order to vote in the primary, one must be:
 "A citizen of the United States for at least one month before the next primary, special, municipal, or general election."
 "A resident of Pennsylvania and the election district in which the individual desires to register and vote for at least 30 days before the next primary, special, municipal, or general election."
 "At least 18 years of age on or before the day of the next primary, special, municipal, or general election."
 A registered Democrat

Convicted felons may not vote from prison and may not register to vote for five years after being released from prison.

Registration
Individuals may register to vote at County Voter Registration offices, through the mail, at a Department of Transportation office, or at various other government agency offices.

Voters must register 30 days prior to the election in order to be eligible to vote; for the 2008 Democratic primary, this means that March 24 is the last day to register.

Results

Note: Twenty seven delegates remained uncommitted until they reached the floor of the convention. Kerry eventually received all 178 delegates from Pennsylvania.

See also
 2004 Democratic Party presidential primaries
 2008 Pennsylvania Democratic presidential primary

References

Pennsylvania
2004 Pennsylvania elections
2004